Concurrent object-oriented programming is a programming paradigm which combines object-oriented programming (OOP) together with concurrency. While numerous programming languages, such as Java, combine OOP with concurrency mechanisms like threads, the phrase "concurrent object-oriented programming" primarily refers to systems where objects themselves are a concurrency primitive, such as when objects are combined with the actor model.

See also
 Active object

External links
 
 Concurrent Object-Oriented Languages and the Inheritance Anomaly
 

Object-oriented programming
Programming paradigms
Concurrent computing
Threads (computing)